Loxophlebia triangulifera is a moth of the subfamily Arctiinae. It was described by Baron Cajetan von Felder in 1874. It is found in Venezuela and the Amazon region.

References

 Arctiidae genus list at Butterflies and Moths of the World of the Natural History Museum

Loxophlebia
Moths described in 1874